Polygamy was abolished in 1964 by the new Civil Code and polygamous marriages entered into after that date would not be valid in Ivory Coast. However, all polygamous marriages entered into prior to that date are still legally recognized in the nation. The practice of polygamy may be punishable by a fine of CFA 50,000 to CFA 500,000 (US$80 to US$800) or six months to three years imprisonment.

References 

Ivory Coast